Petrella Tifernina is a comune (municipality) in the Province of Campobasso in the Italian region Molise, located about  north of Campobasso.

Petrella Tifernina borders the following municipalities: Castellino del Biferno, Limosano, Lucito, Matrice, Montagano.

Demographic evolution

Campo Sportivo
The "Campo Sportivo" is located at the base of this village. It has a parking lot, a bar/convenience store, as well as a sports complex. It has generally replaced the village's piazza as the main gathering place for its residents.

Emigration
Since the end of World War II until the 1970s, the town's population declined considerable due to emigration. The places of choice for these emigrants were the Canadian cities of Montreal and Toronto.

People
Giovanni Di Stefano was born in Petrella in 1955.
 Petrella is also a surname within the United States.
 Adelaide builder and winemaker Mario Di Stefano is from Petrella.

References

Cities and towns in Molise